French Portage Road Historic District is a national historic district located at Westfield in Chautauqua County, New York.  It encompasses the nearly intact 19th century and early 20th century village core clustered around the principal intersection of East Main Street and South Portage and the commons.  There are 104 structures in the district that reflect a variety of architectural styles including Colonial Revival, Greek Revival, and Gothic Revival.

It was listed on the National Register of Historic Places in 1983.

References

External links

Historic districts on the National Register of Historic Places in New York (state)
Colonial Revival architecture in New York (state)
Gothic Revival architecture in New York (state)
Greek Revival architecture in New York (state)
Historic districts in Chautauqua County, New York
National Register of Historic Places in Chautauqua County, New York